Kellen McCoy (born April 16, 1987) is an American former basketball player and current high school coach.  McCoy is best known for his college career at Weber State University, where he was named Big Sky Conference Player of the Year and an honorable mention All-American as a senior in the 2008–09 season.

Playing career
McCoy, a 5'6" point guard from Norman, Oklahoma, came to Weber State after playing two years of junior college basketball at Northern Oklahoma College.  In his senior season, McCoy averaged 14.1 points and 3.6 rebounds per game and teamed with freshman Damian Lillard to lead the Wildcats to a 15–1 Big Sky Conference record and a regular season championship.  At the conclusion of the season, McCoy was named Big Sky Player of the Year and was honored as an honorable mention All-American by the Associated Press.

Following his college career, McCoy signed with ETB Wohnbau Baskets in Germany's Pro A.  He then signed with Borås Basket in Sweden, where he averaged 18.4 points per game in 2010–11.

Coaching career
After this season, McCoy turned to coaching.  After a season at Emporia State University and as a graduate assistant for the University of Oklahoma, he signed on as a full assistant at his alma mater, Weber State.

In 2014, McCoy was named head coach at Mount St. Mary High School in Oklahoma City, Oklahoma.

In 2018, McCoy was named head coach at Norman North High School in Norman, Oklahoma.

The Basketball Tournament (TBT) (2017–present) 

In the summer of 2017, McCoy played in The Basketball Tournament on ESPN for The Wasatch Front (Weber State Alumni).  He competed for the $2 million prize, and for The Wasatch Front, he scored 14 points in their first round loss to Team Challenge ALS 97–81.

References

External links
Eurobasket profile
Weber State bio

1987 births
Living people
American expatriate basketball people in Germany
American expatriate basketball people in Sweden
American men's basketball coaches
American men's basketball players
Basketball players from Oklahoma
Borås Basket players
Emporia State Hornets basketball coaches
ETB Wohnbau Baskets players
High school basketball coaches in the United States
Northern Oklahoma Mavericks men's basketball players
Point guards
Sportspeople from Norman, Oklahoma
Weber State Wildcats men's basketball coaches
Weber State Wildcats men's basketball players